Profile Books is a British independent book publishing firm founded in 1996. It publishes non-fiction subjects including history, biography, memoir, politics, current affairs, travel and popular science.

Profile Books is distributed in the UK by Random House and sold by Faber & Faber, and is part of the Independent Alliance.

History
In 2002 the company acquired the HarperCollins UK business list. The list now includes works by Robert Greene, Ryan Holiday, and Shoshana Zuboff.

In 2003 the company published Eats, Shoots & Leaves by Lynne Truss which was the bestselling non-fiction title for 30 weeks and the Book of the Year at the British Book Awards 2004, at which the company also won the Small Publisher of the Year award.

In January 2007 Profile Books acquired Serpent's Tail, bringing together two small publishers in London. In 2008 Profile set up an ethical imprint GreenProfile under the direction of Mark Ellingham, the founder of Rough Guides.

In 2012, Profile launched a new list with Wellcome Collection, designed to showcase writing about medicine, the body, and the human condition. Authors on the list include Val McDermid,  Atul Gawande and Gavin Francis.

In October 2012 Profile acquired Birmingham-based independent Tindal Street Press.

Since 2014 Profile has published a boutique list of Tuskar Rock, editorially selected by Colm Tóibín and Peter Straus, which includes works by László Krasznahorkai and Chris Kraus (American writer).

In 2017 the first books were published in the new Pursuit Books imprint, a list showcasing writing on cycling.

Notable publications
Authors include Anjana Ahuja, Alan Bennett, Susan Hill, Ian Stewart (mathematician), Jonathan Dimbleby, Sandi Toksvig, Simon Garfield, Robert Greene, Richard Mabey, Simon Jenkins, Margaret MacMillan, David Harvey, Federico Varese and Francesca Simon.

The company publishes all of The Economist books.

Robert Greene
The 48 Laws of Power (2000)
Mastery (2012)
The Laws of Human Nature (2018)

Timothy Brook
Vermeer's Hat: The Seventeenth Century and the Dawn of the Global World (2009)

Richard Wrangham
Catching Fire: How Cooking Made Us Human (2009)
The Goodness Paradox (2019)

Simon Garfield
Just My Type (2010)

Susan Hill
The Man in the Picture (2007)
The Small Hand (2010)
Howards End is on the Landing (2010)
Dolly: A Ghost Story (2012)
Printer's Devil Court (2014)
The Travelling Bag (2016)

Tracy Kidder
Mountains Beyond Mountains (2011)

Jay Bahadur
Deadly Waters (2011)

Patricia and Robert Malcolmson, Nella Last
Nella Last in the 1950s (2010)

James A Robinson, Daron Acemoğlu
Why Nations Fail (2013)

Alan Bennett
The Lady in the Van (1999)
Four Stories (2006)
The Uncommon Reader (2007)A Life Like Other People's (2009)Smut (2011)Keeping On Keeping On 2017

Simon JenkinsA Short History of England (2011)England's 100 Best Views (2013)

Jonathan DimblebyDestiny in the Desert (2012)

David HarveyThe Enigma of Capital and the Crises of Capitalism (2011)Seventeen Contradictions and the End of Capitalism (2014)

James WardAdventures in Stationery (2014)

Atul GawandeBeing MortalShaun Bythell (of Wigtown bookshopThe Diary of a BooksellerEugenia ChengHow to Bake PiBeyond InfinityPrizesAnquetil, Alone by Paul Fournel was shortlisted in two categories in the Sports Book Awards 2018Being Mortal by Atul Gawande was longlisted for the Baillie Gifford Prize 2014
 Catching Fire was shortlisted for the Samuel Johnson Prize in 2010
 Eats, Shoots & Leaves was Book of the Year at Specsavers National Book Awards 2004Frugal Innovation by Navi Radjou and Jaideep Prabhu won the CMI Management Book of the Year Award 2016
 Just My Type won Best British Book at the British Book Design and Production Awards 2011 Moneyland by Oliver Bullough was The Sunday Times Business Book of the Year 2018
 Mountains Beyond Mountains won a BMA Medical Book Award 
 Nella Last in the 1950s was shortlisted for the Portico Prize in 2012 Railways was Sunday Times History Book of the Year 2015
 The Small Hand won a Best Jacket / Cover Design award at the British Book Design and Production Awards 2011 
 Vermeer's Hat won the Mark Lynton History Prize in 2009
 Why Nations Fail won the Financial Times and Goldman Sachs Business Book of the Year Award in 2012

Profile Books has won the "Independent Publisher of the Year" awards three times. In 2017 The Essex Serpent'' (published in the Serpent's Tail imprint) was named the Fiction Book of the Year, the Book of the Year, and won Publicity Campaign of the Year Award at the British Book Awards.

References

External links

Profile Books on Facebook
Profile Books on Twitter
Serpent's Tail website

Book publishing companies of the United Kingdom
Publishing companies established in 1996